António Augusto da Silva Veloso (born 31 January 1957) is a Portuguese former footballer who played most of his professional career with Benfica. A gritty defender who could appear in the flanks and on occasion in the middle, he played for a decade and a half at his main club, and was team captain from 1988 to 1995.

An international for nearly 15 years, Veloso represented Portugal at Euro 1984.

Club career
Born in São João da Madeira, Veloso starting playing football with hometown's A.D. Sanjoanense, then moved to S.C. Beira-Mar for a further two seasons. He joined Primeira Liga club S.L. Benfica for 1980–81, and was an everpresent fixture until his retirement, helping the capital side to seven leagues and five cups.

With Benfica, Veloso also played in the UEFA Cup final in 1982–83, as they lost to R.S.C. Anderlecht 1–2 on aggregate and, most notably, in the 1987–88 European Champions Cup final, where he missed the penalty shootout attempt that gave PSV Eindhoven the final win (5–6).

An injury left Veloso out of the team that reached the 1990 European Cup final, lost to A.C. Milan. He retired at 38 after 15 seasons with the same club and more than 500 overall appearances, subsequently becoming a coach.

International career
Veloso earned 40 caps for Portugal, making his debut on 18 November 1981 in a 2–1 win over Scotland for the 1982 FIFA World Cup qualifiers. He played at UEFA Euro 1984 where the national team reached the semi-finals, and was left outside the 1986 World Cup squad due to a doping test, which was later proved to be fake.

Veloso's last international game came at age 36 in a 2–2 draw with Spain on 19 January 1994, in a friendly match.

Personal life
Veloso's son, Miguel, is also a professional footballer. After an unassuming youth spell at Benfica, he went on to represent neighbours Sporting CP and also the national team.

Honours
Benfica
Primeira Liga: 1980–81, 1982–83, 1983–84, 1986–87, 1988–89, 1990–91, 1993–94
Taça de Portugal: 1980–81, 1982–83, 1984–85, 1985–86, 1986–87, 1992–93
Supertaça Cândido de Oliveira: 1980, 1985, 1989

References

Further reading

External links
 
 
 

1957 births
Living people
People from São João da Madeira
Portuguese footballers
Association football defenders
Primeira Liga players
Liga Portugal 2 players
A.D. Sanjoanense players
S.C. Beira-Mar players
S.L. Benfica footballers
Portugal international footballers
UEFA Euro 1984 players
Portuguese football managers
Primeira Liga managers
Liga Portugal 2 managers
Atlético Clube de Portugal managers
S.L. Benfica non-playing staff
S.L. Benfica B managers
C.F. Estrela da Amadora managers
Sportspeople from Aveiro District